Tino Hanekamp (born 1979) is a German journalist and author.  In 2012, he was awarded the Förderpreis Komische Literatur, for his first novel So was von da.

References

External links
  (in German)

1979 births
Living people

German male writers